The 2022–23 UNC Wilmington Seahawks men's basketball team represents the University of North Carolina Wilmington in the 2022–23 NCAA Division I men's basketball season. The Seahawks, led by third-year head coach Takayo Siddle, play their home games at Trask Coliseum in Wilmington, North Carolina as members of the Colonial Athletic Association.

Previous season
The Seahawks finished the 2021–22 season 27–9, 15–3 in CAA play to finish as CAA regular season co-champions, alongside Towson. As the No. 2 seed, they defeated No. 7 seed Elon and College of Charleston to reach the championship game of the CAA tournament. They were upset by No. 5 seed Delaware in the championship game. They were invited to the CBI, where they defeated VMI, Drake, Northern Colorado and Middle Tennessee to win the CBI championship.

Roster

Schedule and results

|-
!colspan=12 style=| Exhibition

|-
!colspan=12 style=| Non-conference regular season

|-
!colspan=9 style=| CAA regular season

|-
!colspan=12 style=| CAA tournament

Sources

References

UNC Wilmington Seahawks men's basketball seasons
UNC Wilmington Seahawks
UNC Wilmington Seahawks men's basketball
UNC Wilmington Seahawks men's basketball